Bryson N. Williams (born April 25, 1998) is an American professional basketball player for the Ontario Clippers of the NBA G League. He played college basketball for the Fresno State Bulldogs, UTEP Miners and Texas Tech Red Raiders.

High school career
Williams played basketball for Theodore Roosevelt High School in Fresno, California. As a Freshman, His Team would finish 15-14 and finish second in the North Yosemite League, His Team lost in the second round of the CIF Central Section to Mission Oak High School, His Team finished Top 10 in the CIF Central D3 Basketball. As a Sophomore, His Team would finish 27-8 and finish first in the North Yosemite League, His Team finished Top 15 in the CIF's Central Section, His Team reached CIF Central Section D3 Championship but lost to NYL League rival Fresno High School. As a Junior, His Team would go 24-5 and finish first in the North Yosemite League, His Team would finish Top 10 in the CIF's Central Section, His Team reached Central Section's D2 Semi-Finals but lost to Mission Oak High School. As a senior, he averaged 34 points and 18 rebounds per game. His Team would also have a 25-8 record and finish first place in the North Yosemite League, ranked Top 15 in the Central Section, Top 35 in CIF D3 Men's Basketball and 1st in the Central Section's D3 Men's Basketball, and win the CIF Central Section D3 Men's Basketball Championship against Selma High School. He set school and city records with 2,302 career points. Williams formed a relationship with Fresno State head coach Rodney Terry in eighth grade and committed to play college basketball for the program as soon as he was old enough.

College career
As a freshman at Fresno State, Williams averaged 7.7 points and 4.4 rebounds per game. He was the runner-up for the Mountain West Freshman of the Year award. As a sophomore, Williams averaged 13.8 points and 6.1 rebounds per game, and received Third Team All-Mountain West honors from the league's coaches. For his junior season, he transferred to UTEP, following head coach Rodney Terry. He sat out a year as a redshirt and worked on his shooting. On January 15, 2020, Williams posted a career-high 34 points and 10 rebounds in an 80–77 overtime win against UTSA. He averaged 17.8 points and 7.2 rebounds per game as a junior, and was named to the First Team All-Conference USA. In his senior season, Williams averaged 15.1 points and 7.4 rebounds per game, earning Third Team All-Conference USA honors. He opted to use an additional year of eligibility, granted due to the COVID-19 pandemic, transferring to Texas Tech. On February 22, 2022, Williams surpassed the 2,000 point mark in a 66-42 win over Oklahoma, and finished with 13 points. For his super-senior year, Williams received First Team All-Big 12 and Big 12 All-Newcomer Team honors from the league's coaches.

Professional career

Ontario Clippers (2022–present)
On October 24, 2022, Williams joined the Ontario Clippers training camp roster.

Career statistics

College

|-
| style="text-align:left;"| 2016–17
| style="text-align:left;"| Fresno State
| 33 || 26 || 17.2 || .603 || – || .652 || 4.4 || .2 || .4 || .6 || 7.7
|-
| style="text-align:left;"| 2017–18
| style="text-align:left;"| Fresno State
| 32 || 32 || 28.6 || .596 || .250 || .602 || 6.1 || 1.2 || .5 || .7 || 13.8
|-
| style="text-align:left;"| 2018–19
| style="text-align:left;"| UTEP
| style="text-align:center;" colspan="11"|  Redshirt
|-
| style="text-align:left;"| 2019–20
| style="text-align:left;"| UTEP
| 32 || 32 || 31.8 || .499 || .356 || .811 || 7.2 || .9 || .9 || .9 || 17.8
|-
| style="text-align:left;"| 2020–21
| style="text-align:left;"| UTEP
| 24 || 24 || 31.4 || .481 || .279 || .836 || 7.4 || .9 || .6 || .5 || 15.1
|-
| style="text-align:left;"| 2021–22
| style="text-align:left;"| Texas Tech
| 37 || 37 || 25.6 || .535 || .417 || .755 || 4.2 || 1.1 || .5 || .4 || 14.1
|- class="sortbottom"
| style="text-align:center;" colspan="2"| Career
| 158 || 151 || 26.6 || .569 || .357 || .740 || 5.7 || .8 || .6 || .6 || 13.6

References

External links
Texas Tech Red Raiders bio
UTEP Miners bio
Fresno State Bulldogs bio
Sports Reference page

1998 births
Living people
American men's basketball players
Basketball players from California
Fresno State Bulldogs men's basketball players
Power forwards (basketball)
Sportspeople from Fresno, California
Texas Tech Red Raiders basketball players
UTEP Miners men's basketball players